Montegiorgio is a comune (municipality) in the Province of Fermo in the Italian region Marche, located about  south of Ancona and about  north of Ascoli Piceno.

Montegiorgio borders the following municipalities: Belmonte Piceno, Falerone, Fermo, Francavilla d'Ete, Magliano di Tenna, Massa Fermana, Montappone, Monte San Pietrangeli, Monte Vidon Corrado, Rapagnano.

Main sights
Remains of the portal of church of San Salvatore (late 14th century)
Castle walls (13th-14th centuries)
Church of San Francesco (13th century, restored in the 16th century)
Castles of Cerreto and Alteta

People
Domenico Alaleona (1881–1900), composer

References

External links
Historical center of Montegiorgio

Cities and towns in the Marche